The Minnesota Journal of Law, Science & Technology is a biannual law review edited by students and faculty from the University of Minnesota. It was established in 2000 as the Minnesota Intellectual Property Review and covers issues in patents, trademarks, copyrights, bioethics, science, and technology as it relates to the law. Claire Colby is the editor-in-chief of Volume 24. 

The journal is the 6th most cited Intellectual Property law journal, 5th most cited environmental and land use law journal, 3rd most cited health, medicine & psychology law journal, and 4th most cited science, technology, and computing law journal.

References

External links

MJLST sample

Publications established in 2000
Intellectual property law journals
Biannual journals
University of Minnesota
English-language journals